Dreamer is a novel written by Daniel Quinn in 1988.

Plot summary

Awake, Greg Donner falls in love with the beautiful red-headed Ginny Winters, a woman with a mysterious past. Asleep, Greg dreams of pursuing Ginny through a terrifyingly deserted Chicago. Awake, Richard Iles is confined to a sanatorium in Kentucky and trapped in a turbulent marriage to Ginny Winters. Asleep, Richard dreams he is Greg Donner. And when he next wakes up, he IS Greg Donner. But Ginny has gone. Overall, Quinn regards this work as a love story that depicts certain components of his relationship with his own wife.

1988 American novels
Novels set in Chicago
Tor Books books